About a Feeling is the debut album by Summer Heart, released April 25, 2012 by Swedish label Sommarhjärta.

The album was written and recorded between December 2011 and February 2012 in David Alexander's home studio. Alexander plays all the instruments on the record.

A special edition of the album was released in Japan by Fastcut Records. The Japanese edition of the album features the bonus tracks Please Stay, Hold On, and Hit Me Up Again.

Track listing

References

2012 debut albums
Summer Heart albums